Sorvikha (Sarwa) is a rural locality (a selo) in Kalinnikovsky Selsoviet, Birsky District, Bashkortostan, Russia. The population was 97 as of 2010. There are 5 streets.

Geography 
Sorvikha is located 39 km southeast of Birsk (the district's administrative centre) by road. Zuyevo is the nearest rural locality.

References 

Rural localities in Birsky District